Toxocystis is a genus of parasites of the phylum Apicomplexia.

Only one species (Toxocystis homari) is known in this genus.

History

This genus was described in 1910 by Léger and Duboscq.

Description

This parasite is found in the caecum of the lobster Homarus gammarus.

Host records

European lobster (Homarus gammarus)

References

Aconoidasida
Apicomplexa genera
Diseases and parasites of crustaceans
Monotypic genera